St John the Baptist Church, or St John's, is a Church of England parish church in the town of Buckhurst Hill in Essex, England.

History
The church was built in 1837 as a chapel of ease. The following year Buckhurst Hill was constituted a separate ecclesiastical district. At this time the area was part of the ancient parish of Chigwell. Buckhurst Hill did not become a separate parish until 1867.
In June 2017 the church celebrated its 180th anniversary.

References

External links
 The official website of St John the Baptist, Buckhurst Hill

Buckhurst Hill
Grade II listed churches in Essex